is a railway station in Chūō-ku, Sapporo, Hokkaidō, Japan. It is served by Hakodate Main Line and Chitose Line. The station is numbered H02.

Station layout
The station consists of two island platforms connected by a footbridge, serving four tracks. The station has automated ticket machines, automated turnstiles which accept Kitaca, and a "Midori no Madoguchi" staffed ticket office.

Platforms

Adjacent stations

Surrounding area
 Toyohira River
 , (to Asahikawa)
 , (to Hamatonbetsu)
 JR Hokkaido Naebo Workshop, Hokkaido Railway Technology Museum
 JR Hokkaido Naebo Operation Office
 JR Hokkaido Training Center
 JR Freight Vehicle factory
 Sapporo Beer Museum
 Japan Ground Self-Defense Force Vice-Camp Naebo
 Sapporo Factory
 Taiheiyo Cement, Sapporo branch
 Hokkaido Nippon Ham Fighters Indoor Practice Field

References

External links
 Naebo JR Hokkaido map

Railway stations in Japan opened in 1910
Railway stations in Sapporo